Federal Highway 54D is a toll highway connecting Guadalajara, Jalisco to Colima City. The road is operated by Operadora de Autopistas Sayula, which charges cars 272 pesos to travel Highway 54D.

Route description
The road proceeds south and southwest through Zacoalco de Torres, Sayula, Ciudad Guzmán and Atenquique in Jalisco, as well as Cuauhtémoc in Colima, before ending northeast of Colima city. In total, it has seven interchanges.

References

External links
Autopista Guadalajara-Colima website

Mexican Federal Highways